Lander is an unincorporated community in Frederick County, Maryland, United States. Lock 29 on the C&O Canal is located in Lander.

References

 Unincorporated communities in Frederick County, Maryland
 Unincorporated communities in Maryland